Troy William Buckley (born March 3, 1968) is an American college baseball coach and former catcher. He is the pitching coach for the Fresno State Bulldogs. He played college baseball at Santa Clara University from 1987 to 1989 for coach John Oldham. He served as the head coach at California State University, Long Beach from 2011 season until April 11, 2019. He has also coached in the minor league systems of the Pittsburgh Pirates and Montreal Expos.

Playing career
Born in Los Altos, California, Buckley attended Bellarmine College Preparatory in San Jose, California, earning all-conference honors from the San Jose Mercury News as a senior in 1986. At Santa Clara University, Buckley played at catcher from 1987 to 1989 on the Santa Clara Broncos baseball team. Buckley earned West Coast Conference Player of the Year and second-team All-American honors in 1988. After the 1988 season, he played collegiate summer baseball with the Cotuit Kettleers of the Cape Cod Baseball League. He was drafted in the ninth round of the 1989 Major League Baseball Draft by the Minnesota Twins.  He played in the minor leagues from 1990 to 1995, rising as high as Class-AAA before turning to coaching.

Coaching career
Buckley began coaching with the Montreal Expos Class AA affiliate as a hitting instructor and third base coach.  After one season at Ottawa, he became a pitching coach for the GCL Expos.  Santa Clara then hired him as pitching coach and recruiting coordinator, a post in which he served for three seasons before moving to Long Beach State in the same capacity.  With the 49ers, Buckley coached future All Star Jered Weaver, among many others.  Weaver won the Dick Howser Trophy and Roger Clemens Award for National Player of the Year and pitcher of the year in college baseball.  The 49ers (also known as the Dirtbags) were among the nation's best in team ERA, finishing in the top 5 nationally three times.

In 2008, Buckley accepted the role of pitching coordinator for the Pittsburgh Pirates minor league system.  He served in that role for two seasons before returning to Long Beach State as associate head coach.  Buckley served in that role for one year before taking the head coaching role in 2011.  In his three years back with the 49ers, the team ERA has improved from 4.67 to a Big West Conference-best 3.08 and finished above .500 in both seasons with Buckley as head coach.

On April 11, 2019, Long Beach State fired Buckley after the Dirtbags started the 2019 season 5–26, including 0–3 in conference games. Assistant coaches Greg Bergeron and Dan Ricabal became interim co-head coaches.

On July 9, 2019, Buckley was named the associate head coach and pitching coach at the University of Nevada, Reno.

On December 8, 2022, Buckley was named the pitching coach at Fresno State.

Head coaching record
Below is a table of Buckley's yearly records as an NCAA head baseball coach.

Notes

References

1968 births
Living people
Baseball catchers
Santa Clara Broncos baseball players
Santa Clara Broncos baseball coaches
Cotuit Kettleers players
Long Beach State Dirtbags baseball coaches
People from Los Altos, California
Visalia Oaks players
Portland Beavers players
Fort Myers Miracle players
Chattanooga Lookouts players
Winston-Salem Spirits players
Harrisburg Senators players
Nevada Wolf Pack baseball coaches
Anchorage Bucs players
Fresno State Bulldogs baseball coaches